To the Bride, released in 1975, is a two-LP live album featuring Barry McGuire, 2nd Chapter of Acts, and a band called David. The album was culled from four concerts performed in the summer of 1975 and is the first of two live albums that 2nd Chapter of Acts recorded for Myrrh Records, although the majority of the concert is performed by McGuire. The album was re-released on two CDs in 2007 with one song excluded.

Track listing
Source:

Side one
 "Intro"  – 0:56
 "Come to Praise the Lord" – 3:30
 "Little Bitty Dude"  – 3:23
 "He's Coming Back" – 4:52
 "Sad Song"  – 2:36
 "Happy Road" – 3:33
 "Acts Intro"  – 2:23

Side two
 "Which Way's the Light" – 2:03
 "Love, Peace, Joy" – 2:38
 "Layers"  – 1:05
 "I Wonder" – 1:55
 "Ogre"  – 0:51
 "Am I Seeing You" – 2:15
 "Denomination Blues" – 2:43 (Washington Phillips song, omitted from the CD version)
 "A Friend" " – 0:18
 "Jimmy's Song" – 2:33
 "Snow White"  – 1:36
 "Prince Song" – 3:27

Side three
 "He Alone Is Worthy" – 0:46 (chorus of O Come All Ye Faithful with modified lyrics; continuation of "Prince Song" coda)
 "Easter Song" – 2:34
 "He Is Coming" – 3:18
 "Anyone But Jesus" – 4:10
 "The Only Way"  – 1:53
 "Sing the Melody" – 3:22
 "Shock Absorbers"  – 1:55
 "Chosen Generation" – 3:25

Side four
 "Jesus People" – 2:33
 "I Walked a Mile" – 4:26
 "Dolphins"  – 4:27
 "Callin' Me Home" – 3:54
 "Each Other"  – 0:13
 "Doesn't That Bible Say" – 4:25
 "Brainwashed"  – 0:49
 "Doesn't That Bible Say" (reprise) – 1:52

 Spoken song introductions.

Side two and the first three tracks of side three are performed by the 2nd Chapter of Acts. The majority of these songs do not appear on any of their other albums.

Personnel
 Buck Herring – producer, mixer
 Wally Duguid – engineer
 Gary Bonar – assistant engineers
 Phil Stephen – assistant engineers
 Barry McGuire – vocals, guitar
 Annie Herring – piano, vocals
 Nelly Greisen – vocals
 Matthew Ward – vocals
 Jack Kelly – drums
 Paul Offenbacher – guitars
 Rick Azim – guitars
 Herb Melton – bass
 Richard Souther – piano, multi-keyboards, background vocals
 Peter York – rhythm guitar, background vocals
 Jerry Melrose – concert coordinator

References

Live Christian music albums
1975 live albums
Collaborative albums